Carlos Cecílio Nunes Góis Mota (died 25 January 1973) was a Portuguese former and 29th president of Sporting CP between 28 January 1953 and 31 January 1957.

Career
A Licentiate in law from the University of Lisbon and a lawyer, he became president of the Junta de Crédito Pública and Procurator General of the Republic.

He became an associate of Sporting CP in December 1934 and was part of the social bodies of the club in many mandates, fulfilling many duties for twelve consecutive years, having participated nine times in the club's direction before becoming its president, two as a vogal and seven consecutive as vice president, between 19 January 1946 and 30 January 1952. He was part of the counsel general, organ he presided between 1963 and 1965, and of which he was considered a member for life. He was also created an associate of merit.

Under his leadership José Travassos, one of the Five Violins (Cinco Violinos), who also played in his time and included António Jesus Correia, Fernando Peyroteo, Albano and Manuel Vasques, in 1955, was the first Portuguese soccer player to become a player for the Selection of Europe against Great Britain and Northern Ireland, in Belfast, gaining his nickname "Zé da Europa".

Sporting had to compete in lent pitches until finally Estádio José Alvalade was built and inaugurated by him on 10 June 1956 at Campo Grande, in Lisbon. This event also coincided with the Golden anniversary of the club, celebrated with a vast ensemble of activities and in a manner never seen before in the country. For the occasion was also published the book "50 Anos ao Serviço do Desporto e da Pátria" ("Fifty Years at the Service of Sport and Motherland"), which constitutes a unique document about the history of the first half a century of Sporting CP. The club's motto "Esforço, Dedicação, Devoção e Glória: Eis o Sporting" ("Effort, Dedication, Devotion and Glory: Here Is Sporting") was also adopted during his tenure, one that gave a special attention to Sportig's Filiations and Delegations both in the continent, the islands and the overseas.

The club has won the Portuguese Football Championship and the Cup of Portugal in 1952/1953, the Portuguese Football Championship again in 1953/1954, with which he finished a sequence of four consecutive winnings, and the Championship of Reserves in 1954/1955.

He has also sent two Embassies of the club to Brazil, receiving the Knighthood of the Order of the Southern Cross for one of those occasions.

He was once the protagonist of an event in 1953 involving goalkeeper Carlos António Gomes, later soccer player at Futebol Clube Barreirense, mentioned in his memory book O Jogo da Vida. His income was 5,000$00 escudos or five contos a month and, finding it a low wage, he asked in an audience with the President for a raise to 20,000$00 escudos or 20 contos, which he denied. Góis Mota said "You want more money? Well put inside your head, if you have it, that as long as I am President it's five contos or nothing. What do you want more money for? For putas and automobiles? The goalkeeper responded that it was none of his business, and that he did not accept that he was paid "five miserable contos" when some of the players were receiving 20 or more. This confrontation later had negative results on his career.

Góis Mota was also famed for once entering into the referee's cabin, at midtime, reportedly with a pistol in his hand, on 11 November 1956, at the Estádio da Tapadinha, during a game Atlético CP – Sporting. The game was tied 1-1 and apparently he was not enjoying the arbitration of Braga Barros, referee from Leiria, and he "advised him to take a better care in the 2nd part because he could get wronged.,

Contrary to the popular belief he was not a PIDE Agent. He was actually Member, Commander and Secretary General of the Portuguese Legion. In this position in 1961, at the outbreak of the Portuguese Colonial War, he recruited a company (called terço in the Portuguese Legion) of volunteers in order to protect the facilities of the Companhia Angolana de Agricultura, owned by the Espírito Santo Silva banking family in Cuanza Sul Province. It was also by his initiative that he and the Services of Information of the Portuguese Legion then headed by retired Education Inspector Parente de Figueiredo and which included also journalist Luís Lupi, hired, in order to become a special agent in Angola Fernando da Conceição Araújo, a former merchant and colonist at New Lisbon who had bankrupt, remaining his supervisor.

He is the grandfather of António Mota de Sousa Horta Osório.

References and notes

Sources
 https://dn.sapo.pt/especiais/interior.aspx?content_id=984212
 http://www.publico.pt/desporto/noticia/o-futebol-e-mais-instrumentalizado-hoje-do-que-foi-durante-o-estado-novo-1592434
 http://www.sporting.pt/English/Club/club_presidents.asp 
 José Carlos de Ataíde de Tavares, Amarais Osórios - Senhores da Casa de Almeidinha, Edição do Autor, 1.ª Edição, Lisboa, 1986, p. 366
 Various, Anuário da Nobreza de Portugal, III, 1985, Tomo II, p. 1,054
 Various, Anuário da Nobreza de Portugal, III, 2006, Tomo III, p. 1,073
 Carlos Cecílio Góis Mota in a Portuguese Genealogical site

Year of birth unknown
1973 deaths
Portuguese jurists
Portuguese football chairmen and investors
Sporting CP presidents
University of Lisbon alumni